Rudbeckia maxima, the great coneflower, is a flowering plant in the family Asteraceae, which is used as an ornamental plant. They can reach a maximum height of eight feet. Once it produces seeds, finches and other small birds come to feed on them.

References

 

maxima